Allen Russell Gerhardt (born August 13, 1950) is an American former professional baseball player.

In 1969, he played collegiate summer baseball with the Chatham A's of the Cape Cod Baseball League. Gerhardt was named "Sandlot Player of the Year" by the National Baseball Congress in 1970. He was selected by the Padres in the 12th round of the 1972 Major League Baseball Draft.

In 35 ⅔ big-league innings pitched, Gerhardt allowed 44 hits and 17 bases on balls, with 22 strikeouts. He recorded one save and won two of his three decisions. His one save came on September 7, 1974  (1 2/3rd perfect innings against the Astros).

Gerhardt spent his entire nine-season active career (1972–1979; 1981) in the Padres' organization. After it ended, he became a coach and manager in the farm systems of the Padres and the Texas Rangers. Since the mid-1990s he has been a scouting supervisor for the Major League Baseball Scouting Bureau based in North Texas and Louisiana.

References

External links

1950 births
Living people
Alexandria Aces players
Amarillo Gold Sox players
Baseball players from Maryland
Clemson Tigers baseball players
Chatham Anglers players
Hawaii Islanders players
Major League Baseball pitchers
Major League Baseball scouts
Reno Silver Sox players
San Diego Padres players
Tri-City Padres players
Alaska Goldpanners of Fairbanks players